Paul Cameron (born 1939) is an American psychologist.

Paul Cameron may also refer to:

Paul Cameron (New Zealand footballer), association football player
Paul Cameron (cinematographer) (born 1958), American cinematographer
Paul Cameron (gridiron football) (born 1932), American football player
Paul Cameron (Australian footballer) (1904–1978), Australian rules footballer